Osvaldo Ramírez may refer to:
 Osvaldo Ramírez (footballer, born 1984), Argentine footballer
 Osvaldo Ramírez (footballer, born 1997), American soccer player

See also
 Oswaldo Ramírez  (born  1947), Peruvian footballer